Lucas von Breda (18 April 1676, Stockholm - 9 April 1752, Stockholm) was a Swedish portrait painter, art collector, and industrialist. He is sometimes referred to as The Elder, to distinguish him from his son, ; an insurance adjuster.

Life and work
He was born to the wholesale merchant, Pieter von Breda of hamburg, whose family was originally from Brabant. Pieter and his wife, Alida née Hidding, moved to Stockholm around 1670. When Alida became a widow, in the 1690s, she arranged for Lucas to take art lessons from Martin Mijtens, with whom he was allowed to make his first foreign trip in 1697. After visiting Germany and the Netherlands, he went to Paris where, in 1704, he continued his studies with Nicolas de Largillière. 

Largillière's influence was decisive, although Breda chose a different approach to color. He returned home in 1712, and quickly became a popular portraitist among the upper classes. His paintings stood out from those of his contemporaries by, among other things, a red and violet representation of skin color. He also created works with mythological motifs; notably a Venus and Adonis which was found in an art collection in Neschers. 

In 1718, he married Elisabeth Buchholtz; niece of the famous architect, Carl Hårleman. His dowry from her family included a silk factory and a dyehouse. These businesses increasingly occupied more of his time, so that his painting began to suffer. After 1725, he had virtually given it up. He instead turned his attention to art collecting, laying the foundations for a gallery that his son would establish at the Nationalmuseum. 

His overall production was not extensive, and the majority of his works are in private collections. His grandson, Carl Frederik von Breda, was also a portrait painter.

Sources
 Gösta Lilja, Bror Olsson, Knut Andersson and S. Artur Svensson (Eds.) Svenskt konstnärslexikon (1952-1967), Part I, pp.239-240
 Gabriel Anrep, Svenska adelns Ättar-taflor (Descendants of Swedish Nobility), Gustaf Elgenstierna, Stockholm 1925
 Biographical notes from the Svenskt biografiskt handlexikon @ Project Runeberg
 Biographical notes from the Nordisk familjebok @ Project Runeberg 
 Brief biography @ the Lexikonett Amanda

External links 
 
 Works by Breda @ the Nationalmuseum

1676 births
1752 deaths
Swedish painters
Swedish portrait painters
Artists from Stockholm